To cast lots or draw lots is to make a random selection.

Casting lots or drawing lots  may refer to:
 Cleromancy, a form of divination .
 Lottery, a form of gambling that involves the drawing of numbers for a prize .
 Sortition, the practice of randomly selecting political officials from a larger pool of candidates .
 Drawing lots (cards), the practice, in card games, of cutting or drawing a random card to determine seating, partners, or first dealer.
 Drawing straws, using cut straws to select a random outcome .